Shin Myat Hla was the mother of King Swa Saw Ke of Ava and Queen Saw Omma of Pinya. Her husband Min Shin Saw was governor of Thayet.

Ancestry
The following is the ancestry of Shin Myat Hla as reported by the Hmannan Yazawin chronicle (Hmannan Vol. 1 2003: 358, 360, 402–403). She was a granddaughter of King Narathihapate of Pagan, and a niece of King Thihathu of Pinya.

References

Bibliography
 

Myinsaing dynasty
Pinya dynasty